Jury Talykh (also transliterated Yuri or Iurii, born 25 August 1990) is a Russian luger who has competed since the 2009. A natural track luger, he won a bronze medal in the mixed team event at the 2011 FIL World Luge Natural Track Championships in Umhausen, Austria.

References
FIL-Luge profile

External links

 

1990 births
Living people
Russian male lugers